Francesca Victoria R. "Frankie" Jones (born 9 November 1990) is a retired Welsh rhythmic gymnast who represented Wales at three successive Commonwealth Games. At the 2014 Commonwealth Games Jones won both the Ribbon event in rhythmic gymnastics and the David Dixon Award.

Career
At the 2006 Commonwealth Games, Jones finished 12th overall in the individual all-around competition. At the 2010 Commonwealth Games, Francesca again represented Wales in the rhythmic gymnastic competition, this time finishing in 4th place overall and winning the event's prestigious silver medal in the hoop discipline. Jones is the current Welsh and British Rhythmic Gymnastics Champion .  At the 2014 Commonwealth Games, she was a member of the silver-medal-winning team from Wales, and also won gold in the individual ribbon, and silver medals in the individual hoop, ball and clubs, as well as silver in the individual all-around.

Jones also represented Great Britain in rhythmic gymnastics as an allocated host entry berth in the 2012 Summer Olympics where she finished in last place amongst 24 gymnasts.  Her routine was set to "The Bird and the Worm" by The Used.

References

External links
 
 
 
 
 

1990 births
Living people
British rhythmic gymnasts
Welsh gymnasts
Gymnasts at the 2006 Commonwealth Games
Gymnasts at the 2010 Commonwealth Games
Gymnasts at the 2014 Commonwealth Games
Gymnasts at the 2012 Summer Olympics
Commonwealth Games gold medallists for Wales
Commonwealth Games silver medallists for Wales
Olympic gymnasts of Great Britain
Commonwealth Games medallists in gymnastics
Medallists at the 2010 Commonwealth Games
Medallists at the 2014 Commonwealth Games